George Thomas Hedley (1882–1937) was an English footballer who played in the Football League for Hull City, Leicester Fosse and Middlesbrough.

References

1882 births
1937 deaths
English footballers
Association football defenders
English Football League players
West Stanley F.C. players
Middlesbrough F.C. players
Chester-le-Street Town F.C. players
Heart of Midlothian F.C. players
Hull City A.F.C. players
Leicester City F.C. players
Luton Town F.C. players
Hartlepool United F.C. players
Crook Town A.F.C. players